Jebamani Janata, is a political party in India. It is registered with the Election Commission of India, but still unrecognized.

References
Election Commission of India

Registered unrecognised political parties in India